Nanticoke is an unincorporated community and former city located on the western border of Haldimand County, Ontario, Canada. Nanticoke is located directly across Lake Erie from the US city of Erie, Pennsylvania.

Summary
Unlike the majority of Haldimand or Norfolk County, Nanticoke is a highly-industrialized community, which is southeast of Simcoe in neighbouring Norfolk County and south of Brantford. Nanticoke's residential area is bordered on the west by the Nanticoke Industrial Park, home to the Stelco Lake Erie Works and a number of smaller businesses, including Charles Jones Industrial, ESM, and Air Products. The neighbouring Nanticoke Refinery on the northeast and the former (demolished in 2019) Nanticoke Generating Station on the southeast are not part of the Industrial Park land, although this is frequently confused due to their proximity.

Empire Communities believes in the potential of Nanticoke, and they have backed that belief with their wallet, purchasing 4,200 acres of land in the area with a vision of building a thriving community on the underutilized lands that were once envisioned as a massive industrial park.They are planning to make 15,000 homes , lots of commercial and industrial development.

One of Nanticoke's nearby natural landmarks is Peacock Point, which is composed of modest working class houses. One of the closest communities to Nanticoke is Jarvis, which is only  to the north. There are plenty of streams, valleys, and Lake Erie within a short driving distance of Nanticoke.

History
Once considered to be a bustling farming and fishing community, and inhabited since the late 18th century, Nanticoke adapted itself to the Industrial Revolution and became a desired spot for heavy industry to move in through the decades.

In 1974, Nanticoke was incorporated as a city within the Regional Municipality of Haldimand-Norfolk through the amalgamation of the towns of Port Dover and Waterford, the village of Jarvis, and parts of the townships of Rainham, Townsend, Walpole and Woodhouse. In 2001, the town and all other municipalities within the region were dissolved and the region was divided into two single-tier municipalities with city-status but called counties. What was the city of Nanticoke is now split between Haldimand County (Ward 1) and Norfolk County (Wards 6 and 7).

Wind turbines were implemented in this community in November 2013.

Notable people
 Harold Cotton, retired ice hockey player
 Ryan Nie, retired ice hockey player

References

Communities in Haldimand County
Former cities in Ontario
Populated places disestablished in 2001
Populated places on Lake Erie in Canada